Samosdelka  is a fishing village in southern Russia (about 40 km south-south-west of the city of Astrakhan) near which archaeologists reported in September 2008 that they had found the remains of Atil, the capital of the medieval Khazar kingdom.

Archaeology
A team of archaeologists, led by Dmitry Vasilyev of Astrakhan State University, had been excavating for nine years. According to Vasilyev, they found the remains of an ancient brick fortress in the newly found 9th and 10th century layers, which contained characteristic Khazar yurts. The investigated area covered more than 2 square kilometers. "This is a hugely important discovery ... We can now shed light on one of the most intriguing mysteries of that period – how the Khazars actually lived. We know very little about the Khazars – about their traditions, their funerary rites, their culture."

The layout of the city conforms to the written sources. As reported by Norman Finkelshteyn, it was "a city bisected by riverbeds with a central island citadel of fired brick". The central portion of Samosdelka was located on an island between dried-up river beds. Old documents said that Atil's castle was located on an island in the center of the city.

The fortress at Samosdelka had a triangular shape was made from limestone bricks. It is known from written sources that the Khazar khagan had a monopoly on brick buildings. Traces of a widespread fire were found at Samosdelka in an Atil layer. The fire was probably set during the conquest of Atil by Kievan Rus' prince Sviatoslav I in 968 or 969 CE.

Layers of 11th-12th centuries have Oghuz artifacts and are associated with Saqsin.

Notes

External links
The Khazar Capital City of Atil
Russian archaeologists find long-lost Jewish capital (Yediot Ahronot)

 Scholar claims to find medieval Jewish capital  Yahoo!

Khazar towns
Former populated places in Russia
Forts in Russia
Archaeological sites in Russia
Defunct towns in Russia
Cultural heritage monuments in Astrakhan Oblast
Objects of cultural heritage of Russia of federal significance